The Donald and Morris Goodkind Bridges are a pair of bridges on U.S. Route 1 in the U.S. state of New Jersey. The bridges cross the Raritan River, connecting Edison on the north bank with New Brunswick on the south.

The northbound span, a concrete arch bridge, is named after its designer, New Jersey Highway Department engineer Morris Goodkind. This span was completed in 1929 and reflects the Art Deco styling of the time. Along both sides of the bridge, there are historical plaques that read of the site's significance to both the Lenape Indians and the American colonists. Originally named the College Bridge, it was renamed the Morris Goodkind Bridge on April 25, 1969. Morris had a son, Donald, who also became an architect and engineer for the New Jersey Department of Transportation. Donald designed the southbound bridge, a steel span bridge built in 1974, which was named after him in 2004.

In popular culture
In the 1983 musical film Eddie and the Cruisers, fictional rock band leader Eddie Wilson was believed to have drowned when his 1957 Chevrolet Bel Air went off the Morris Goodkind Bridge on March 15, 1964.

In The Sopranos episode "Nobody Knows Anything," Detective Vin Makazian leaps to his death from the Donald Goodkind Bridge.

See also
List of crossings of the Raritan River

See also
 
 
 
 List of crossings of the Raritan River

References

Bridges over the Raritan River
Bridges completed in 1929
Bridges completed in 1974
Bridges in Middlesex County, New Jersey
Art Deco architecture in New Jersey
Road bridges in New Jersey
U.S. Route 1
Bridges of the United States Numbered Highway System
Edison, New Jersey
New Brunswick, New Jersey
Open-spandrel deck arch bridges in the United States
Concrete bridges in the United States
Steel bridges in the United States
1929 establishments in New Jersey